Dypsis antanambensis is a species of flowering plant in the Arecaceae family. It is a palm endemic to Madagascar, where it grows in rainforests. The whole population occurs within Mananara-Nord National Park and there are fewer than 50 mature individuals estimated to remain.

References

antanambensis
Endemic flora of Madagascar
Endangered plants
Taxonomy articles created by Polbot
Taxa named by Henk Jaap Beentje
Flora of the Madagascar lowland forests